Ian Macdonald (1873-14 September 1932) was a Scottish physician. He was educated at the Royal High School, Edinburgh and studied at the University of Edinburgh where he was awarded the degrees of M.B., C.M. in 1894, and M.D. in 1898. His M.D. was entitled 'Treatment of superficial burns by picric acid solution: a study in repair'.

In Literature 
In "A Time to Keep" Dr. Halliday Sutherland (his cousin) wrote about Macdonald, including his final days in 1932" The book also described the work of the clinic.

Dr Macdonald's Huelva house is discussed in this 2015 newspaper article.

References 

1873 births
1932 deaths
19th-century Scottish medical doctors
20th-century Scottish medical doctors
Alumni of the University of Edinburgh Medical School
Malariologists
People educated at the Royal High School, Edinburgh